The North River Terminal or Rechnoy Vokzal (meaning "River Station"), is one of two passenger terminals of river transport in Moscow. It is also the main hub for long-range and intercity routes. The terminal was built in 1937. The facility was renovated and upgraded from 2018 to 2020.

See also
 Moscow Canal
 Moskva River
 South River Terminal

References

External links
 Riverstar photo gallery
 Yet another photo gallery

Transport infrastructure completed in 1937
Stalinist architecture
Buildings and structures in Moscow
Ports and harbours of Russia
Water transport in Russia
Cultural heritage monuments of regional significance in Moscow